Reprise is the 19th studio album by American musician Moby, released on May 28, 2021 by Deutsche Grammophon. It features orchestral and acoustic arrangements of songs from his career, performed by the Budapest Art Orchestra, a string quartet, along with multiple guest artists.

Background
The album originates to when Moby attended a Bryan Ferry concert in Los Angeles, where a booker for the Los Angeles Philharmonic offered him the chance of performing live with the orchestra. This led to Moby's first ever concert with an orchestra, which took place in October 2018 at the Walt Disney Concert Hall with conductor Gustavo Dudamel and Mayor Eric Garcetti on piano. A representative from Deutsche Grammophon approached Moby backstage with the idea of making an orchestral album, and he leapt at the idea. About the idea of his own songs re-recorded the classical way, Moby said, "Sometimes you just want direct, honest communication. Using acoustic and classical instruments allows you to increase the chances that direct vulnerable communication will be there. I don't know if I achieved that with Reprise, but that was the goal."

After selecting a group of songs from his discography and preparing basic orchestral arrangements to accompany them at his home studio in Los Feliz, Los Angeles, initial sessions took place at East-West Studios in Los Angeles where tracks featuring piano, guitar, percussion, drums, and from a chamber orchestra were put down. When it came to recording the final orchestral parts, orchestras based in London, Berlin, and Memphis, Tennessee were considered but decided against. In the end, the Budapest Art Orchestra was chosen and Moby decided not to attend the sessions in Budapest in person as he preferred to hand over his arrangements to a professional orchestrator.

On March 26, 2021, Moby announced the album, and released "Porcelain" on his YouTube channel on the same day.

Critical reception 
The Independent critic recalled that “the original tracks felt as though they were recorded under the adrenalin of artificial lights, but these reworkings are flooded with daylight. It’s as though Moby is opening the curtains after a party, smoothing down the soft furnishings and carefully placing the crockery in the sink. The tracks lose their tension but gain an orderly, classical frame.”

According to Gary Ryan of NME, Reprise is “full of dignified reworkings that don’t offer too many surprises”. “By drilling down to the compositional basics of his songs and then divesting them of their interesting production flourishes, [Moby] perversely makes them feel more like aural wallpaper.”

Track listing

Notes
 All tracks are noted as "Reprise Version".

Personnel
Musicians

 Moby – bass (1, 2, 5, 6, 8, 10, 11, 13, 14), guitars (1, 2, 5, 6, 8–14), piano (1, 3, 6, 8–10, 13, 14), synthesizer (2, 3, 6, 8, 11, 13), percussion (3), vocals (4, 5, 10, 11, 13), organ (5, 9), Rhodes (5), synth bass (10)
 Joseph Trapanese – conductor
 Tripp Beam – drums (1–5, 8–11, 13, 14)
 Budapest Art Orchestra – orchestra
 Apollo Jane – background vocals (2, 10), vocals (8)
 The Samples – choir (2, 8, 10)
 Jason White – choir conductor (2, 8, 10)
 Alex Acuña – percussion (2–4, 8, 10)
 Amythyst Kiah – vocals (2)
 Gregory Porter – vocals (2)
 Jim James – vocals (4)
 Mindy Jones – vocals (6), background vocals (9, 10, 13)
 Víkingur Ólafsson – piano (7)
 Deitrick Haddon – additional vocals (8)
 Kris Kristofferson – vocals (9)
 Mark Lanegan – vocals (9)
 Daron Murphy – background vocals (10)
 Laura Dawn – background vocals (10)
 Alice Skye – vocals (12)
 Luna Li – vocals (12)
 Nataly Dawn – vocals (12)
 Darlingside – vocals (13, 14)
 Novo Amor – vocals (13)
 Skylar Grey – vocals (14)

Technical

 Moby – producer, recording engineer
 Jonathan Nesvadba – co-producer, recording engineer
 Joseph Trapanese – orchestra producer
 Mark Wilder – mastering engineer
 Alan Meyerson – mixer
 Sturla Mio Þórisson – recording engineer (7)

Charts

References

2021 albums
Deutsche Grammophon albums
Moby albums